Once Removed is a novel by Canadian author Andrew Unger published in 2020. Published by Turnstone Press, the book is a satire set in the fictional town of Edenfeld, Manitoba and tells the story of Timothy Heppner, a ghostwriter trying to preserve the history of his small Mennonite town.

Plot

At the beginning of the novel, Timothy Heppner is working for the town's Parks and Recreation Department, removing trees and destroying historic buildings to make room for strip malls. He also sidelines as a ghostwriter writing family history and genealogy books for locals, but finds he is losing clients. Eventually he is tasked with writing a thorough and true history of the town and, along with his wife Katie and the town's Preservation Society, he attempts to preserve the house of a famous local writer Elsie Dyck, who's been cast out of town for writing negatively about it. In the process he comes into conflict with the town's mayor who is set on gentrification and boosterism.

Reception and Awards

The book was shortlisted for the 2020 Margaret McWilliams Award and won the Eileen McTavish Sykes Awards for Best First Book at the Manitoba Book Awards in 2021. Due to its themes of heritage and historic preservation, it was listed as a Recommended Read by the National Trust for Canada in 2021.

In reference to the book's humour, Morley Walker, in a review for the Winnipeg Free Press called the book a "good-natured ribbing of Mennonite culture," while saying that "you don’t need to be a Menno to find him amusing, but it won’t hurt." Walker also suggests the town of Edenfeld is a "fill-in" for Steinbach, Manitoba, with the fictional Elsie Dyck inspired by the real-life author Miriam Toews. 

Scholar Robert Zacharias has cited Once Removed, along with Casey Plett's work, as representative of a shift in Mennonite literature by depicting characters who have chosen to stay within their communities, rather than leaving them, and has also pointed out metafictional allusions to other Mennonite writers such as Miriam Toews, Di Brandt, and David Bergen within the book. Scholar Nathan Dueck has called the book a künstlerroman in its portrayal of Timothy Heppner's growth as a writer.

References

2020 Canadian novels
Novels set in Manitoba